The kaekeeke is a Hawaiian idiophone consisting of a bamboo tube, usually between 0.3 and 1.0 meters.  The kaekeeke is played by striking it against a mat on the ground.  They are sometimes used to accompany hula.

See also
Hand percussion

Sources
Hawaiian dictionary: Hawaiian-English, English-Hawaiian. Mary Kawena Pukui, Samuel H. Elbert. University of Hawaii Press, 1986. ,  Pg 109

External links
 Ranga Pae - Ka'eke'eke (includes photograph and recording)

Idiophones
Hawaiian musical instruments